Oliver Larraz (born September 16, 2001) is an American soccer player who plays as a midfielder for Major League Soccer club Colorado Rapids.

Career 
Larraz joined the Colorado Rapids academy in 2014. In 2019, he featured for MSV Duisburg U-19s.

On March 3, 2021, Larraz signed with Colorado as a homegrown player. Larraz proceeded to make his competitive debut for the club on May 15, 2021 in a home match against the Houston Dynamo. He entered the match in the 90th minute as a substitute for Jack Price as Colorado won 3-1.

On August 6, 2021, Larraz joined USL Championship side San Diego Loyal on loan.

Career statistics

Club

References

External links 
Profile at Colorado Rapids
Profile at Major League Soccer
Profile at US Development Academy

2001 births
Living people
American soccer players
Soccer players from Denver
Association football midfielders
Major League Soccer players
USL Championship players
Colorado Rapids players
San Diego Loyal SC players
Homegrown Players (MLS)